The Ministry of Defence of Republika Srpska was the ministry in the government of Republika Srpska in charge of formulating, developing and implementing defence system of Republika Srpska. The ministry existed between 1992 and 2005.

List of ministers

See also 
 Army of Republika Srpska
 General Staff of the Army of Republika Srpska

References 

Politics of Republika Srpska
Military of Republika Srpska
Organizations based in Republika Srpska
1992 establishments in Bosnia and Herzegovina
2005 disestablishments in Bosnia and Herzegovina